Herbert Sound is a sound in Antarctica extending from Cape Lachman and Keltie Head on the northwest to the narrows between The Naze and False Island Point on the southeast, separating Vega Island from James Ross Island and connecting Prince Gustav Channel with Erebus and Terror Gulf. On January 6, 1843, Captain James Clark Ross discovered a broad embayment east of the sound, which he named "Sidney Herbert Bay" after Sidney Herbert, First Secretary to the Admiralty. The sound proper was discovered and charted by the Swedish Antarctic Expedition, 1901–04, under Otto Nordenskiöld, who included it with the broad embayment under the name "Sidney Herbert Sound". The recommended application restricts Herbert Sound to the area west of the narrows between The Naze and False Island Point; the embayment discovered by Ross forms the western margin of Erebus and Terror Gulf.

References

Sounds of Graham Land
Landforms of the James Ross Island group